Palestine, Indiana may refer to:

 Palestine, Kosciusko County, Indiana
 Palestine, Franklin County, Indiana
 Palestine, Lawrence County, Indiana
 New Palestine, Indiana
 Poseyville, Indiana (in Posey County), originally named Palestine

See also
 Palestine (disambiguation)